Dave Edwardson is an American musician who is the bassist and backing vocalist of Californian post-metal band Neurosis. He founded the band alongside Scott Kelly and Jason Roeder in 1985, and the group would later form experimental/noise group Tribes of Neurot, Neurosis' alter ego.

Edwardson played as the guest bassist for most of Nailbomb's set at 1995's Dynamo Open Air festival. It was one of only two live performances by the band, and the recording was released in 1996 as the album Proud to Commit Commercial Suicide.

In 2002, he released the album Seize the Day with Oakland punk rock band The Enemies on Lookout! Records. He is also in J.F.C.(Jesus Fucking Christ), an Oakland punk trio, has played on numerous albums by I Am Spoonbender, and is the bass player in the Bay Area punk rock group Kicker. Edwardson was brought in for Krallice’s seventh full-length record, Loüm, in 2017. Neurosis' Edwardson, Noah Landis, and Roeder typically avoid interviews.

References 

American heavy metal musicians
Living people
Neurosis (band) members
Year of birth missing (living people)